Clagiraba is a rural locality in the City of Gold Coast, Queensland, Australia.

Geography

It is nestled between Mount Nathan and Witheren and also encompasses the southern end of Tamborine Mountain. Though zoned rural, it is a comparatively short (15 minute) drive to more populous suburbs such as Nerang, Oxenford and Pacific Pines. It is approximately a 30-minute drive to many of the Gold Coast region's beach destinations such as Surfers Paradise, Main Beach and the Spit.

Road infrastructure
Beaudesert-Nerang Road (State Route 90) runs through from east to south-west. Nerang–Murwillumbah Road (State Route 97) runs along a part of the south-eastern boundary.

History
Clagiraba is named from Clagiraba Creek, a tributary of the Coomera River. The name Clagiraba is derived from the indigenous name 'Kalagareebah' meaning young or single men's ground. This was a region where young indigenous men were taken during their initiation ceremony.

Clagiraba is also home to Miss Universe Australia 2010, Jesinta Campbell, who placed second runner up.

At the 2011 Australian Census the suburb recorded a population of 561.

References

External links

  — includes Clagiraba

Suburbs of the Gold Coast, Queensland
Localities in Queensland